Wrong Number is a 1959 British crime film directed by Vernon Sewell and starring Peter Reynolds, Lisa Gastoni and Olive Sloane. It was produced as a second feature at Merton Park Studios in London. The film's sets were designed by the art director Wilfred Arnold.

Cast
 Peter Reynolds as Angelo
 Lisa Gastoni as Maria
 Peter Elliott as Dr. Pole
 Olive Sloane as Miss Crystal
 Paul Whitsun-Jones as Cyril
 Barry Keegan as Max
 John Horsley as Supt. Blake
 Harold Goodwin as Bates
 David Davenport as Sergeant Jones
 Catharina Ferraz as Mrs. Landi
 John Grima as Albin
 Arthur Lovegrove as Saunders

References

Bibliography
 Chibnall, Steve & McFarlane, Brian. The British 'B' Film. Palgrave MacMillan, 2009.

External links
 

1959 films
1959 crime films
British crime films
Films directed by Vernon Sewell
Merton Park Studios films
Telephony in popular culture
1950s English-language films
1950s British films